Dr. Geevarghese Mor Gregorios (Perumpally Thirumeni) (10 October 1933 – 22 February 1999) was a bishop of the Syriac Orthodox Church, President of the Episcopal Synod of the Church in India, President of the Synod of the Malankara Jacobite Syrian Orthodox Church and the Metropolitan of Cochin, Kottayam, Kollam, Niranam and Thumpamon Dioceses.

Beginnings
Geevarghese was born in the ancient aristocratic family of Parapallil in Puthupally, Kottayam as the third son of Mathew Asan and Annamma. His father died when he was very young and he was taken care of by his elder brother P.M.Mathew.

Geevarghese received his theological education at Thrikkothamangalam Mor Sharbil Dayro and Manjanikkara Mor Ignatius Dayro.

He was ordained priest by Yulius Elias Qoro on 1 August 1958 and for several years served as the vicar of St. George's Simhasana Church, Perumpally.

Bishopric
Fr. Geevarghese was elected to the episcopate by the Malankara Jacobite Syrian Christian Association meeting at St. George Church, Karingachira in January 1974. Consecrated metropolitan by Patriarch Ignatius Ya`qub III on 24 February 1974 for Cochin diocese with additional charge of Kottayam diocese, Gregorios became the Metropolitan of Kottayam after the 1982 Synod at Cochin presided by Patriarch Ignatius Zakka I Iwas. In the early 1970s, when the church in Malankara became divided again over the role of the Patriarchate of Antioch, Gregorios led the faithful who maintained their spiritual association with Antioch. Following the death of Catholicos Baselios Paulose II on 2 September 1996, Geevarghese presided over the Episcopal Synod and the Synod of the Malankara Syrian Orthodox Church until his own death.

Death
Geevarghese died on 22 February 1999 from a kidney disease. His remains are interred in the sanctuary of the Perumpally Simhasana Church. Patriarch Ignatius Zakka I Iwas visited this church in April 2000 to offer memorial prayers at his tomb.

Legacy
Perumpally Thirumeni wrote many of the prayer songs of the Syrian Orthodox Church. He has the record of ordaining the most priests, more than a hundred, the majority, like thirumeni, without theological education.  Many church buildings were named in memory of Geevarghese Gregorios. He started the Hail Mary Residential school at Perumpally.

References

External links
 Mor Gregorios Geevarghese
 Perumpally Simhasana Church website
 Mor Gregorios Geevarghese; Syriac Orthodox Resource
 Web Archive about Mor Gregorios Geevarghese

1933 births
1999 deaths
Christian clergy from Kottayam
Syriac Orthodox Church bishops